Sudis may refer to:

 Sudis (fish), a genus of barracudinas
 Sudis (stake), a stake used by Roman soldiers for constructing field fortifications.